Goclenius may refer to:

 Conrad Goclenius (1490-1539), German humanist
 Rudolph Goclenius the Elder (1547–1628), German scholastic philosopher
 Rudolph Goclenius the Younger (1572–1621), German physician and professor of physics, medicine and mathematics; son of the elder Goclenius
 Goclenius, a lunar crater named after the younger Goclenius